Ancylis apicella is a moth of the family Tortricidae. It is found in the Palearctic realm.

The wingspan is 12–17 mm.

The larvae feed on Frangula alnus, Rhamnus frangula, Ligustrum, Prunus spinosa and Cornus.

References

External links 
UKmoths
Lepidoptera of Belgium
Lepiforum.de
Microplepidoptera.nl 

Palearctic Lepidoptera
Tortricidae of Europe
Moths described in 1775
Taxa named by Michael Denis
Taxa named by Ignaz Schiffermüller